George Washington (1732–1799) was the commander-in-chief of Continental forces in the American Revolution and the first president of the United States.

People with the surname Washington
 George Washington (baseball) (1907–1985), American baseball player
 George Washington (inventor) (1871–1946), Belgium-born American inventor of an instant coffee process
 George Washington Jr. (1899–1966), his son, inventor of a photoengraving process for newspapers
 George Washington (Mississippi politician)  state legislator
 George Washington (trombonist) (born 1907), American jazz trombonist
 George Washington (Washington pioneer) (1817–1905), African American pioneer, founder of Centralia, Washington
 George Augustine Washington (1815–1892), American tobacco planter, slaveholder, company director and politician
 George Corbin Washington (1789–1854), United States Congressman from Maryland
 George Dewey Washington (1898–1954), American singer
 George Steptoe Washington (1771–1809), planter, militia officer and nephew of the first President
 George Thomas Washington (1908–1971), judge of the U.S. Court of Appeals for the D.C. Circuit
 George T. Washington (Liberia), Liberian political figure

People with the given name George Washington
 George Washington Adams (1801–1829), American politician, and eldest son of U.S. President John Quincy Adams
 George Washington Anderson (1832–1902), American politician 
 George Washington Bethune (1805–1862), preacher-pastor in the Dutch Reformed Church
 George Washington Blanchard (1884–1964), American politician
 George Washington Bolton (1841–1931), American banker and politician
 George Washington Bridges (1825–1873), American politician
 George Washington Browne (1853–1939), British architect
 George Washington Bush (1779–1863), American pioneer
 George Washington Caldwell (1849–1916), Michigan State Representative from 1897 through 1900
 George Washington Campbell (1769–1848), 5th U.S. Secretary of the Treasury
 George Washington Campbell (1828–1905), cofounder and lifelong board member of Alabama's Tuskegee Institute
 George Washington Carver (c. 1864/5–1943), American botanist
 George Washington Cass (1810–1888), American industrialist
George Washington Collins (1925–1972),American politician
 George Washington Crile (1864–1943), American surgeon
 George Washington Parke Custis (1781–1857), adopted son (and also step-grandson) of President George Washington
 George Washington Cullum (1809–1892), Union Army general 
 George Washington Cutter (1801–1865), American poet and Mexican War veteran
 George Washington DeLong (1844–1881), United States Navy officer
 George Washington Dietzler (1826–1884), Union Army general
 George Washington Dixon (1801–1861), American singer, stage actor, and newspaper editor
 George Washington Doane (1799–1859), American churchman, Protestant Episcopal bishop of New Jersey
 George Washington Donaghey (1856–1937), governor of the U.S. state of Arkansas from 1909 to 1913
 George Washington Emery Dorsey (1842–1911), American politician
 George Washington Duke (1820–1905), American tobacco industrialist and philanthropist
 George Washington Dupee (1826-1897), American Baptist leader
 George Washington Gale Ferris Jr. (1859–1896), American engineer
 George Washington Fleeger (1839–1894), American politician
 George Washington Gale (1789–1861), an American minister
 George Washington Getty (1819–1901), American Civil War Union general
 George Washington Glasscock (1810–1868), early settler, legislator, and businessman in Tousha
 George Washington Glick (1827–1911), American politician
 George Washington Goethals (1858–1928), U.S. Army officer and civil engineer
 George Washington Gordon (1836–1911), Confederate Army general
 George Washington Grayson (1843–1920), Creek scholar, writer, and nationalist
 George Washington Greene (1775–1793), son of General Nathanael Greene
 George Washington Greene (1811–1883), American historian & grandson of General Greene
 George Washington Harris (1814–1869), American humorist
 George Washington Hays (1863–1927), American politician
 George Washington Helme (1822–1893), American businessman and soldier
 George Washington Hockley (1802–1854), a Texas revolutionary who served as Secretary of War for the Republic of Texas
 George Washington Hopkins (1804–1861), American politician, diplomat, lawyer, judge and teacher
 George Washington Johnson (1811–1862), first Confederate governor of Kentucky
 George Washington Johnson (1846-1914), American singer and pioneer sound recording artist
 George Washington Jones (Tennessee politician) (1806–1884), American politician
 George Washington Jones (Texas politician) (1828–1903), American politician
 George Washington Julian (1817–1899), American politician, writer, candidate for Vice President of the United States
 Georges Washington de La Fayette (1779–1849), son of the Marquis de Lafayette (French hero of the American Revolutionary War)
 George Washington Lambert (1873–1930), Australian artist
 George Washington Custis Lee (also known as Custis Lee) (1832–1913), eldest son of Robert E. Lee
 George Washington Lent Marr (1779–1856), American politician
 George Washington Morgan (1820–1893), American Civil War general
 George Washington Ochs Oakes (1861–1931), American journalist
 George Washington Olvany (1876–1952), American judge and politician
 George Washington Owen (1796–1837), American politician
 George Washington Patterson (1799–1879), American politician
 George Washington Peck (1818–1905), American politician
 George Washington Pilipō (1828–1887), Hawaiian politician
 George Washington Plunkitt (1842–1924), American politician
 George Washington Putnam (1826–1899), American soldier and politician
 George Washington Rightmire (1868–1952), American educator
 George Washington Riggs (1813–1881), American businessman
 George Washington Scott (1829–1903), American businessman and military officer
 George Washington Shonk (1850–1900), American politician
 George Washington Steele (1839–1922), American lawyer, soldier, and politician
 George Washington Toland (1796–1869), American politician
 George Washington Truett (1867–1944), American minister and writer
 George Washington Vanderbilt (1839–1864), the son of Cornelius Vanderbilt and a member of the prominent Vanderbilt family
 George Washington Vanderbilt II (1862–1914), builder of the Biltmore House
 George Washington Vanderbilt III (1914–1961), a yachtsman and scientific explorer
 George Washington Walker (1800–1859), English Quaker missionary who settled in Tasmania
 George Washington Whistler (1800–1849), American railroad engineer
 George Washington Williams (1849–1891), American religious figure and politician
 George Washington Williams (1869–1925), United States Navy admiral
 George Washington Wilson (1823–1893), Scottish photographer
 George Washington Woodward (1809–1875), American politician
 George Washington Wright (1816–1885), American politician
 Prince George Washington of Siam (Wichaichan) (1838–1885)

Fictional characters with the given names George Washington
 G. W. Bridge, a Marvel Comics character named after New York City's George Washington Bridge
 George Washington Duke, from the 1990 film Rocky V
 G. W. (George Washington) McLintock, played by John Wayne in 1963 movie McLintock!
 In Metal Gear Solid 2: Sons of Liberty, Arsenal Gear's AI has been given the initials GW
 George Washington, one of the names of the frog from the animated miniseries Over the Garden Wall

See also
 George Washington (disambiguation)
 Georges Washington
 Washington (name)

Name
Compound given names